The Bautek Spice is a German high-wing, single-place, hang glider designed and produced by Bautek and introduced in 2003.

Design and development
The Spice was derived from the Bautek Twister design. Major changes in the Spice include a Mylar leading edge, the lower wing surface extended to 90% of the top surface, a smaller keel pocket and newly designed winglets and wing tips.

The aircraft is made from aluminum tubing, with the wing covered in polyester sailcloth. Its  span wing has a nose angle of 132° and an aspect ratio of 7.7:1.

It was certified as DHV 2-3.

Specifications (Spice)

References

Hang gliders